Cosmosoma centralis is a moth of the family Erebidae. It was described by Francis Walker in 1854. It is found in Brazil (Rio de Janeiro, São Paulo).

References

centralis
Moths described in 1854